The Power Macintosh 8600 is a personal computer designed, manufactured, and sold by Apple Computer from February 1997 to February 1998.  It was introduced alongside the Power Macintosh 7300 and 9600 with a  PowerPC 604e processor, and comes in a new case design that replaces the widely-disliked Quadra 800-based form factor of its predecessor, the Power Macintosh 8500.

Like the 7300 and 9600, the 8600 featured the new PowerPC 604e and 604ev CPU, an enhanced version of the PowerPC 604 used in the predecessor models 8500 and 9500. It used the same new case as the 9600, but was somewhat less expandable (8 instead of 12 RAM sockets, 3 instead of 6 PCI slots) at a lower price, a distinction that was carried over from the previous generation. It includes advanced Audio-Video ports including RCA audio in and out, S-Video in and out and composite video in and out.  The 8600 was plagued with supply problems from the beginning, and only in June 1997, four months after its introduction, was the computer widely available. The 300 MHz model was also delayed after its introduction, but not as heavily as the original model had been.

In August 1997, the original model was replaced with two faster ones, at 250 and 300 MHz, and the 8600 was discontinued in February 1998, a few months after the introduction of its replacement, the  Power Macintosh G3 Mini Tower.

Models  
Introduced February 17, 1997:
 Power Macintosh 8600/200: Includes System 7.5.5.

Introduced August 5, 1997:
 Power Macintosh 8600/250: Includes Mac OS 7.6.1.
 Power Macintosh 8600/300: Includes Mac OS 7.6.1.

Timeline

References

External links 

 Power Macintosh 8600 at Low End Mac
 Power Macintosh 8600/200, 8600/250 and 8600/300 at EveryMac.com

8600
8600
Macintosh towers
Computer-related introductions in 1997